The 1983 Kaduna State gubernatorial election occurred on August 13, 1983. NPN's Lawal Kaita won election for a first term, defeating main opposition Unity Party of Nigeria and other party candidates in the contest.

Electoral system
The Governor of Kaduna State is elected using the plurality voting system.

Results
Lawal Kaita of the NPN defeated other candidates to emerge winner in the contest.

References 

Kad
Gubernatorial election 1983
Kaduna State gubernatorial election